Sorabji is a surname. It may refer to:
Alice Maude Sorabji Pennell (1874–1951), Indian physician and writer
Cornelia Sorabji (1866–1954), first woman barrister from India, social reformer and writer
Francina Sorabji (1833–1910), Indian educator and Christian missionary, mother of Cornelia, Susie, and Alice Maude Sorabji
Kaikhosru Shapurji Sorabji (1892–1988), English composer, music critic, pianist and writer
Richard Sorabji (born 1934), British historian of philosophy
Susie Sorabji (1868–1931), Indian educator and Christian missionary

See also:
Sorabji Colah (1902–1950), Indian cricketer
Sorabji Pochkhanawala (1881–1937), Indian banker and one of the founders of the Central Bank of India
Soli Sorabjee (1930–2021), Indian jurist